The Directorate-General for Taxation and Customs Union (DG TAXUD) is a Directorate-General of the European Commission. The DG Taxation and Customs manages, defends and develops the customs union as a vital part of protecting the external borders of the European Union. It also co-ordinates taxation policy across the European Union.

Structure

The Directorate-General is presently organised into five directorates: 

 Directorate A: Customs
 Directorate B: Digital Delivery of Customs and Taxation Policies
 Directorate C: Indirect Taxation and Tax Administration
 Directorate D: Direct taxation, Tax Coordination, Economic Analysis and Evaluation
 Directorate E: International and General Affairs

The department is headed by Director-General Mr Gerassimos Thomas, a Greek national. Since January 2022, Mr Thomas is supported by a Principal Adviser for Strategy and Economic Analysis Coordination. 

Previously, the Directorate-General was organised into the following five directorates:
Directorate A: Customs Policy, Legislation, Tariff
Directorate B: Security & Safety, Trade Facilitation & International coordination
Directorate C: Indirect Taxation and Tax Administration
Directorate D: Direct taxation, Tax Coordination, Economic Analysis and Evaluation
Directorate E: Resources and International Affairs

See also
European Commissioner for Economy
Customs union
Taxation
Single European Act
General Agreement on Tariffs and Trade (GATT)

References

External links
Directorate-General for Taxation and Customs Union
European Customs Information Portal (ECIP)
TARIC - Online customs tariff database
eLearning courses in Customs and Taxation

Taxation and Customs Union
International taxation
Tax organizations